The Republican Union was a pro-statehood political party in Puerto Rico, that also contemplated total autonomy in the case that U.S. statehood was denied.

Founding
The Republican Union was founded in 1932 from the merging of the Partido Republicano Puro (Pure Republican Party) and the conservative wing of the Alianza. Together with the Socialist Party, it was part of an electoral alliance known as Coalición.

References

Further reading 
José Trías Monge, Puerto Rico: The Trials of the Oldest Colony in the World (Yale University Press, 1997) 

Defunct political parties in Puerto Rico
Political parties established in 1932